Margaret Irving (January 18, 1898 – March 5, 1988) was an American stage and film actress.

Biography
Born in Pittsburgh, Pennsylvania in 1898, Irving is best remembered today for her roles as Aunt Gus in the 1950s sitcom The People's Choice and as Mrs. Whitehead  in  Animal Crackers (1930) starring the Marx Brothers, a role she originated on the Broadway stage. Her other films included  San Francisco (1936), Captain Calamity (1936), Follow Your Heart (1936), Charlie Chan at the Opera (1936), Mr. Moto's Last Warning (1939), and In Society (1944). 

She was married to William Frederick James. She died in 1988 in San Francisco, California, at the age of 90.

Filmography

References

External links

1898 births
1988 deaths
American film actresses
Actresses from Pittsburgh
20th-century American actresses